Aphantopus is a butterfly genus of the Satyrinae. The genus is confined to the Palearctic.

Species
Aphantopus arvensis (Oberthür, 1876) (western China)
Aphantopus arvensis arvensis
Aphantopus arvensis campana Leech, 1892 (central China)
Aphantopus arvensis deqenensis Li, ?1995
Aphantopus hyperantus (Linnaeus, 1758)  - ringlet
Aphantopus hyperantus abaensis Yoshino, 2003
Aphantopus hyperantus alpheois Fruhstorfer, 1908 (Siberia)
Aphantopus hyperantus arctica (Seitz, 1909) (northern Europe)
Aphantopus hyperantus bieti (Oberthür, 1884) (Sichuan, northern Yunnan)
Aphantopus hyperantus luti Evans, 1915 (Tibet)
Aphantopus hyperantus ocellana (Butler, 1882)
Aphantopus hyperantus sajana (O. Bang-Haas, 1906)
Aphantopus hyperantus sibiricus Obraztsov, 1936 (Siberia and the Altai Mountains)
Aphantopus maculosa (Leech, 1890) (China)

References
"Aphantopus Wallengren, 1853" at Markku Savela's Lepidoptera and Some Other Life Forms

External links
 
Images representing Aphantopus at Consortium for the Barcode of Life
Images representing Aphantopus at Encyclopedia of Life

 
Satyrini
Butterfly genera
Taxa named by Hans Daniel Johan Wallengren